The Chief of Staff of the Italian Army refers to the Chiefs of Staffs of the Royal Italian Army from 1882 to 1946 and the Italian Army from 1946 to the present.

List of chiefs of staff

Chiefs of Staff of the Royal Italian Army (1882–1946)

Chiefs of Staff of the Italian Army (1946–present)

See also
Italian Armed Forces
Chief of the Defence Staff (Italy)
Royal Italian Army
Italian Army

Notes

References

External links

Military of Italy
Italian Army
Lists of Italian military personnel
Italy